Intelsat 16  is a communications satellite owned by Intelsat planned to be located at 58°W.L.  It was built by Orbital Sciences Corporation, on a Star-2.4 bus.  Intelsat 16 was formerly known as PAS-11R. It was launched on February 12, 2010 by ILS Proton-M launch vehicle.

The Intelsat 16 (IS-16) satellite was manufactured for Intelsat to provide Direct-To-Home (DTH) transponder capacity for DirecTV subsidiaries. The satellite included 24 Ku band transponders for use over Brazil for Sky Brasil at 43.1 degrees West Longitude or for capacity coverage over Mexico and Gulf of Mexico regions at 58 degrees West Longitude.

References

Spacecraft launched in 2010
Intelsat satellites
Communications satellites in geostationary orbit
Satellite television
Satellites using the GEOStar bus